Bartleby en coulisses (French for "Bartleby behind the scenes") is a documentary film shot in 2009 by the filmmaker Jérémie Carboni.

Production 
At the beginning of 2007, French filmmaker Jérémie Carboni followed French writer Daniel Pennac to film during rehearsals for a reading of Bartleby, the Scrivener in Pépinière Opéra theatre in France. Bartleby, the Scrivener is a story by Herman Melville. Initially, the footage focused on François Duval's work directing, but after the premiere of the show, Carboni edited the footage into a documentary, adding  other interviews.

Cast and crew

Stars
 Daniel Pennac - Himself
 François Duval -  Himself

Director/scriptwriter/editor
 Jérémie Carboni

References

External links 
 
 Photos of rehearsals with Daniel Pennac
 

Documentary films about writers
2009 films
2009 documentary films
French documentary films
Films shot in Paris
Herman Melville
Films directed by Jérémie Carboni
2000s French films